Jašiūnai Manor is the neoclassical manor in Jašiūnai, Šalčininkai district of Lithuania, near River Merkys.

The manor palace, designed by a famous architect Karol Podczaszyński, commissioned by the rector of the Imperial University of Vilna, Jan Śniadecki was built in 1824–1828, along with supporting buildings and a manor park.

The manor had been a cultural center in the early 19th century.  For a time, it was a residence of Juliusz Słowacki, who had been frequently visited by Adam Mickiewicz and Tomasz Zan.

The building has preserved its unique late neoclassical style features with certain traits of the Empire style and Romanticism. The manor is included in the Lithuania's cultural heritage list.

Houses in Lithuania
Houses completed in 1828
Buildings and structures in Vilnius County
Manor houses in Lithuania